David Allison may refer to:

David B. Allison (born 1963), Professor, Obesity researcher, Indiana University
Davey Allison (1961–1993), NASCAR race car driver
David Allison, 2000 Canadian federal election Communist Party candidate
David Allison (Australian politician) (1865–1928), member of the Parliament of Victoria
David Allison (referee) (born 1948), English Premier League soccer official
Dave Allison (born 1959), former ice hockey player and current head coach
David Wright Allison (1826–1906), Canadian politician, farmer, manufacturer and speculator
David Allison (cricketer) (born 1948), English cricketer
David Allison (college president) (1836–1924), Canadian academic
David Allison (footballer) (1873–?), English footballer
David Clark Allison (1881–1962), American architect with Allison & Allison
Dave Allison, musician who released the album A V 1 which features contribution from Mark Hollis
David Blair Allison (1944–2016), Professor of Philosophy, Stony Brook University